, or simply  or , is the moon god in Japanese mythology and the Shinto religion.

There is so little known about Tsukuyomi that even their sex is unknown.

Tsukuyomi was the second of the  born when Izanagi-no-Mikoto, the god who created the first land of Onogoroshima, was cleansing himself of his sins while bathing after escaping the underworld and the clutches of his enraged dead sister, Izanami-no-Mikoto. Tsukuyomi was born when he washed out of Izanagi's right eye. However, in an alternative story, Tsukuyomi was born from a mirror made of white copper in Izanagi's right hand.

Tsukuyomi angered Amaterasu when he killed Ukemochi, the goddess of food. Amaterasu once sent Tsukuyomi to represent her at a feast presented by Ukemochi. The goddess created the food by turning to the ocean and spitting out a fish, then facing a forest and spitting out game, and finally turning to a rice paddy and coughing up a bowl of rice. Tsukuyomi was utterly disgusted by the fact that, although it looked exquisite, the meal was made in a disgusting manner, and so he killed her.

Amaterasu learned what happened and she was so angry that she refused to ever look at Tsukuyomi again, forever moving to another part of the sky. This is the reason that day and night are never together. This is according to one of the accounts in the Nihon Shoki. Tsukuyomi does not have such significance in the Kojiki, in which there is a similar tale about Susanoo-no-Mikoto killing a similar food goddess named Ōgetsuhime, who is often conflated with Ukemochi.

Gallery

See also
 List of lunar deities

References

External links

Tsukiyomi on the Japanese History Database.

Japanese deities
Lunar gods
Shinto kami
Personifications
Amatsukami